Manuela Wüthrich, who goes by the stage name Nuela Charles, is a Canadian, Swiss, and Kenyan musician, who plays a style of soul, pop, r&b, jazz and hip hop music. She has released four musical works, Aware (2012), The Grand Hustle (2016), Distant Danger (2018), and Melt (2019).

Early life and background
Charles was born, Manuela Wüthrich, on 19 January, in Kenya. She graduated from Briercrest College and Seminary in 2008, and she identifies as a Christian.

Music career
Her music recording career started in 2012, with the studio album Aware, released on 23 October 2012. She released another studio album, The Grand Hustle, on 4 November 2016.

Discography
Aware (23 October 2012)
The Grand Hustle (4 November 2016)
Distant Danger (19 October 2018)
Melt (8 November 2019)
Blissful Madness EP (30 April 2021)

Awards and nominations

References

External links
 

1985 births
Living people
Canadian Christians
Canadian women pop singers
Canadian people of Swiss descent
21st-century Kenyan women singers
Kenyan Christians
Musicians from Edmonton
Canadian soul singers
Canadian contemporary R&B singers
21st-century Black Canadian women singers